Viktor Ivanovich Likhonosov (30 April 1936 – 9 August 2021) was a Russian writer, laureate of the Russian State Prize (1988), the International Mikhail Sholokhov prize and the first Yasnaya Polyana award (2003).

Biography 
Likhonosov was born in Topki, Kemerovo Oblast, Soviet Union. In the 1960s, he was part of the Village Prose movement, and was supported by Alexander Tvardovsky who published his debut stories in Novy mir, claiming their author to be 'a Soviet heir to Ivan Bunin'. In the mid-1970s, through Yuri Kazakov, Likhonosov met Boris Zaitsev and Georgy Adamovich and became deeply involved in researching the history of Russian emigration. Unwritten Memoirs: Our Little Paris, a 1986 novel dealing with the modern history of Russian Cossacks abroad, is seen as his major work. Likhonosov lived in Krasnodar where he edited the literary magazine Rodnaya Kubanh.

He died from COVID-19 in Krasnodar on 9 August 2021, at the age of 85, during the COVID-19 pandemic in Russia. His wife had died 10 days prior.

References 

1936 births
2021 deaths
20th-century Russian writers
Russian male essayists
People from Kemerovo
Russian male novelists
Russian magazine editors
Deaths from the COVID-19 pandemic in Russia